The 1909–10 Prima Categoria season was won by Internazionale.

Regulation
Following the creation of the Italy national football team, the Italian Football Federation revamped its championship.

The round robin was introduced in Italy this season.

Registration was free and only subject to a quality committee. The eight clubs of the last years were joined by Ausonia, a Milanese car factory‘s club which paid the enrolment tax to try the experience of a national football championship.

Final classification

Results table

Championship tie-breaker
Played in Vercelli on April 24

Pro Vercelli had previously planned to join a football exhibition on April 24. Inter refused to postpone the match so Pro Vercelli fielded its fourth squad (15-year-old boys) in protest.

References and sources
Almanacco Illustrato del Calcio - La Storia 1898-2004, Panini Edizioni, Modena, September 2005
Carlo Chiesa, La grande storia del calcio italiano, Chapter 2: Juve, scippati due titoli! Inter, l'atroce beffa, pp. 17–32, Guerin Sportivo #5, May 2012.

Notes

1909-10
Italy